Jacek Płuciennik (25 July 1970 – 3 September 1998) was a Polish footballer. He played in four matches for the Poland national football team from 1994 to 1997.

References

External links
 

1970 births
1998 deaths
Polish footballers
Poland international footballers
Place of birth missing
Association footballers not categorized by position